Gavdul-e Markazi Rural District is in the Central District of Malekan County, East Azerbaijan province, Iran. At the National Census of 2006, its population was 26,623 in 6,539 households. There were 28,383 inhabitants in 8,060 households at the following census of 2011. At the most recent census of 2016, the population of the rural district was 29,010 in 8,614 households. The largest of its 22 villages was Laklar, with 4,767 people.

References 

Malekan County

Rural Districts of East Azerbaijan Province

Populated places in East Azerbaijan Province

Populated places in Malekan County